Hadromyia opaca is a species of hoverfly in the family Syrphidae.

Distribution
Canada, United States.

References

Eristalinae
Insects described in 1916
Diptera of North America
Hoverflies of North America
Taxa named by Raymond Corbett Shannon